Jonathan Ogden (died 1803) was a Canadian surgeon and chief justice of Newfoundland.

Born in Nova Scotia, Ogden was sent to St. John's in 1784 as assistant surgeon for the Royal Navy. In 1794, he was appointed magistrate for St. John's and then in 1798 as magistrate of all of Newfoundland and deputy naval officer under Richard Hatt Noble. In 1802, Ogden was appointed Chief Justice of the Supreme Court, a position he had resigned the following year.

See also
 List of people of Newfoundland and Labrador

Notes

Year of birth missing
1803 deaths
Canadian people of English descent
People from Nova Scotia
Newfoundland Colony judges
Royal Navy Medical Service officers